Irving Miller (c. 1903 – December 24, 1980) was an American Rabbi, Jewish leader, and Zionist.

Early life 
Miller was born circa 1903 in Kaunas, Russian Empire. Miller emigrated to the United States in 1912, at the age of 9.

Miller was educated at City College of New York.

Jewish leadership activities 
Miller was the first Secretary-General of the World Jewish Congress from 1936 to 1940.

On November 14, 1949, Miller was elected as president of the American Jewish Congress, succeeding Stephen Samuel Wise.

Zionism 
On March 1, 1954, Miller was elected as the chairman of the American Zionist Council.

Retirement and death 
Miller died on December 24, 1980, in Woodmere, New York, at the age of 77. A funeral service was held two days later, on December 26.

References 

1900s births
1980 deaths
Year of birth uncertain
People from Kaunas
City College of New York alumni
20th-century American rabbis